System Host Board is a term applied to a single-board computer meeting the PICMG 1.3 specification.  PICMG 1.3 extended the previous PICMG specifications to continue support for PCI/PCI-X expansion cards as well as new support for PCI Express.

References

External links 
 PICMG 1.3 SHB Express Resources

Single-board computers